Lauca may refer to:
Lauca, a biosphere reserve in Chile
Lauca Dam, a dam currently being built on the Cuanza River in Angola
Lauca National Park, a national park in Chile
Lauca River, a river flowing from Chile into Bolivia
Lauca (volcano), a volcano in Chile